William Clifford Munro Scott (March 11, 1903 – January 19, 1997) was a Canadian psychoanalyst. He was briefly president of the British Psychoanalytical Society in 1953, and subsequently became the first president of the Canadian Psychoanalytical Society. He was one of Melanie Klein's analysands.

His papers are held at the Library and Archives Canada.

References

External links
 Hughes, A. (1997). Obituary. Int. J. Psycho-Anal., 78:392-394
Gutheil, T., & Gabbard, G. (1993). The concept of boundaries in clinical practice: theoretical and risk-management dimensions. The American Journal of Psychiatry.

Canadian psychoanalysts
1903 births
1997 deaths
Academic staff of McGill University
University of Toronto alumni
People from Wellington County, Ontario